Spoon is the debut and only album by the Icelandic band Spoon. It was released in Iceland in 1994 by Japis Records. Icelandic singer Emilíana Torrini contributed vocals on six of the tracks on the album. The band consisted of Torrini on vocals, Höskuldur Ö. Lárusson on guitar and vocals, Ingi S. Skúlason on bass and Friðrik Júlíusson on drums.

Track listing
"Da Capo" – 3:26
"Taboo" – 3:01 (vocals by Emilíana)
"Vibes" – 2:42
"Tomorrow" – 4:07 (vocals by Emilíana)
"Awake" – 3:49
"Brazilian Sky" – 3:04 (vocals by Emilíana)
"Doubts" – 3:34 (backing vocals by Emilíana)
"Q no A" – 2:44
"Observing" – 3:51 (vocals by Emilíana)
"Adorable" – 3:22 (backing vocals by Emilíana)
"So be it" – 3:24

External links
Spoon at freedb.org

References

1994 albums
Emilíana Torrini albums